Greenhaugh is a small village in Northumberland, England. It is located northwest of Bellingham and borders the Northumberland National Park. It is in the parish of Tarset.

Governance 
Greenhaugh is in the parliamentary constituency of Hexham.

References

External links

Villages in Northumberland